This is a list of secondary schools in Lagos, Nigeria.

A

 American International School of Lagos
 Anwar ul-Islam Girls High School, Ifako/Ijaye, Ojokoro Lagos
 Apata Memorial High School, Ireakari Estate, Isolo
 Atlantic Hall, Poka Epe
 Avi-Cenna International School

B

 Babington Macaulay Junior Seminary
 Baptist Academy, Obanikoro
 British International School Lagos

C

 Chrisland Schools
 CMS Grammar School, Lagos
 Caleb British International School, Lekki

D

 D-Ivy College, Ikeja
 Dowen College

E

 Ebun Pro Veritas International School
 Eko Boys' High School

F

 Federal Government College, Ijanikin
 First Island School, Lekki

G

 German School Lagos
 Good Shepherd Schools
 Government College Ikorodu
 Grace Schools
 Grange School, Ikeja
 Greensprings School

H

 Holy Child College

I

 Ifako International School
 Igbobi College, Yaba
 Ikenna Stars Academy
 Indian Language School
 Institute for Industrial Technology
 International School Lagos
 Isolog schools
 Italian International School "Enrico Mattei"

K

 King's College, Lagos
 Kingsfield College

L

 Lagoon Secondary School, Lekki
 Lagos Preparatory School
 Lagos State Junior Model College Badore
 Lagos State Junior Model College Kankon
 Lagos State Model College Badore
 Lagos State Model College, Igbonla
 Lagos State Model College Kankon
 Lagos State Model Junior College Meiran
 Lebanese Community School
 Lekki British School
 Logic Group of Schools
 Lycée Français Louis Pasteur de Lagos

M

 Makoko Floating School
 Methodist Boys' High School, Victoria Island
 Methodist Girls' High School, Yaba Lagos
 Mictec Schools

Q

 Queen's College, Lagos, Yaba

R

 Redeemer's International Secondary School, Maryland

S

 St Gregory's College, Lagos, South-west Ikoyi
 St. Francis Catholic Secondary School, Nigeria
 State High School

V

 Vivian Fowler Memorial College for Girls

See also

 Education in Nigeria
 List of schools in Nigeria

References

External links
 "Education", Lagos State Government

Schools
Lagos